In Bed With Joan is an American weekly internet and television talk show hosted by Joan Rivers from her bed in her daughter Melissa's house near Malibu, California. Each week, Rivers invited a different guest to talk to her in bed about different things including their past, their love life and their career. Episodes were approximately 20 minutes, and were aired on iTunes and YouTube until her death.

Premise
Each week, Rivers invited a different celebrity to her bed to talk with her about many things including their past, their love life and their career. Each episode started with the celebrity guest talking personally to the camera about what they expect the experience to be like, before the opening credits were then rolled. Rivers then started by saying, "Let's see who's coming out of the closet this week..." and then the guest emerged from the closet in the corner of the room. After casual conversation for the majority of the interview, they then focused on specific segments. Those were usually, 'I'm So Sorry' where the guest was given the opportunity to look into the camera and apologise to anyone they had offended or upset in the past. The next item was the opposite, called 'Sit on It and Rotate' where the celebrity insulted and really gave a piece of their mind to the people who'd been nasty and cruel to them in the past. The third and final segment was called 'Dead or Alive' where Melissa came in with flashcards with a different thing on each and the guest had to choose which one to kill and which one to keep alive (often this was between two different celebrities). The guest then finished the show by clapping the lights out.

The show was set in Rivers's room in the basement of her daughter's house in Malibu, California where she spent half her time living; the other half she spent at her apartment in New York.

Guests on the show have included Kelly Osbourne, Betsy Brandt, RuPaul and Howie Mandel. In the initial preview video, Rivers was seen in bed with Kato Kaelin, Bruce Vilanch and Chris Harrison.

Death of Joan Rivers
After Rivers suffered cardiac arrest on August 28, 2014 and was put into a medically induced coma, the series was put on hiatus with unaired episodes still to be broadcast. Since her death on September 4, 2014, it is not known whether any of the unaired interviews will be released. As of 2022, the remaining episodes were never released.

Episodes

References

Joan Rivers
2013 web series debuts
2014 web series endings
American comedy web series
2010s YouTube series